Axinaea nitida is a species of plant in the family Melastomataceae. It is endemic to Peru.

References

nitida
Near threatened plants
Endemic flora of Peru
Trees of Peru
Taxonomy articles created by Polbot
Taxa named by Alfred Cogniaux